Poland competed at the 2012 Summer Olympics in London, from 27 July to 12 August 2012. This was the nation's twentieth appearance at the Summer Olympics, having missed the 1984 Summer Olympics in Los Angeles because of the Soviet boycott. The Polish Olympic Committee (PKO) sent a total of 218 athletes to the Games, 130 men and 88 women, to compete in 22 sports.

Poland left London with a total of 11 Olympic medals (3 gold, 2 silver, and 6 bronze), tying with Beijing for the nation's highest overall number of medals. Two of the medals were awarded to the team in athletics, sailing, and weightlifting. Among the nation's medalists were shot putter Tomasz Majewski, who successfully defended his Olympic title from Beijing, and double sculls pair Magdalena Fularczyk and Julia Michalska, who became the first Polish women to claim an Olympic rowing medal in 32 years. Windsurfers Przemysław Miarczyński and Zofia Klepacka recaptured their nation's success in sailing, as they each won the bronze medal.

Several Polish athletes, however, suffered setbacks at these Olympic Games. Tennis player Agnieszka Radwańska, who ranked second by the Women's Tennis Association, was surprisingly eliminated in the first round of women's singles. Meanwhile, the men's indoor volleyball team, champions of the 2012 FIVB World League, failed to advance into the semi-finals for the third consecutive time, after losing to Russia in the quarterfinals. Star sailor and double Olympic medalist Mateusz Kusznierewicz, and the men's quadruple sculls team, led by Michał Jeliński, finished outside of the medal standings in the final race.

Medalists

| width="78%" align="left" valign="top" |

| width="22%" align="left" valign="top" |

Delegation 
Polski Komitet Olimpijski (POK) selected a team of 218 athletes, 130 men and 88 women, to compete in 22 sports; it was the nation's fourth-largest team sent to the Olympics. Men's volleyball was the only team-based sport in which Poland had its representation in these Olympic Games. There was only a single competitor in boxing, equestrian eventing, rhythmic gymnastics, and taekwondo. Athletics was the largest team by sport, with a total of 60 competitors.

The Polish team included five past Olympic champions, two of them defending (shot putter Tomasz Majewski, and the men's quadruple sculls team, led by Michał Jeliński). Five Polish athletes, on the other hand, competed at their fifth Olympic Games: rowers Marek Kolbowicz and Adam Korol, sailor and double medalist Mateusz Kusznierewicz, hammer thrower and former champion Szymon Ziółkowski, and sprint kayaker and three-time medalist Aneta Konieczna. Dressage rider Katarzyna Milczarek, at age 46, was the oldest athlete of the team, while relay swimmer Diana Sokołowska was the youngest at age 17.

Other notable Polish athletes featured table tennis player Natalia Partyka, who competed for the second time at both Olympic and Paralympic games, swimmer and triple Olympic medalist Otylia Jędrzejczak in the women's butterfly event, double Olympic medalist Sylwia Gruchała in women's foil fencing, windsurfer and multiple-time world champion Przemysław Miarczyński, and sisters Agnieszka and Urszula Radwańska, who both played in the women's tennis doubles. Agnieszka Radwańska, who ranked second by the Women's Tennis Association, became the first Polish female flag bearer at the opening ceremony.

The following is the list of number of competitors participating in the Games:

Archery

Poland has qualified one archer for the men's individual event, and the other for the women's individual event.

Athletics

Polish athletes have so far achieved qualifying standards in the following athletics events (up to a maximum of 3 athletes in each event at the 'A' Standard, and 1 at the 'B' Standard):

Men
Track & road events

* Advanced by judges decision after being pushed by Kuwait's Mohammad Al-Azemi in the prelims.

Field events

Women
Track & road events

Field events

Combined events – Heptathlon

Badminton

* Adam Cwalina / Michał Łogosz retired after first match. All matches after were valued as 0-21, 0-21

Boxing

Women

Canoeing

Slalom

Sprint
Men

Women

Qualification Legend: FA = Qualify to final (medal); FB = Qualify to final B (non-medal)

Cycling

Road

Track
Sprint

Team sprint

Keirin

Omnium

Mountain biking

Equestrian

Dressage

Eventing

Fencing

Poland has qualified 7 athletes.

Men

Women

Gymnastics

Artistic
Men

Women

Rhythmic

Judo

Men

Women

Modern pentathlon

Rowing

Men

Women

Qualification Legend: FA=Final A (medal); FB=Final B (non-medal); FC=Final C (non-medal); FD=Final D (non-medal); FE=Final E (non-medal); FF=Final F (non-medal); SA/B=Semifinals A/B; SC/D=Semifinals C/D; SE/F=Semifinals E/F; QF=Quarterfinals; R=Repechage

Sailing

Poland has so far qualified 1 boat for each of the following events:

Men

Women

Open

M = Medal race; EL = Eliminated – did not advance into the medal race;

Shooting

Poland has qualified for four quota places in shooting events;

Women

Swimming

Polish swimmers have so far achieved qualifying standards in the following events (up to a maximum of 2 swimmers in each event at the Olympic Qualifying Time (OQT), and 1 at the Olympic Selection Time (OST)):

Men

Women

Table tennis

Poland has qualified one athlete for singles table tennis events. Based on her world ranking as of 16 May 2011 Li Qian has qualified for the women's event.

Taekwondo

Poland has qualified 1 athlete.

Tennis

Men

Women

Mixed

Triathlon

Volleyball

Poland has qualified men's teams for both the indoor tournament and the beach tournament.
 Men's indoor event – 1 team of 12 players
 Men's beach event – 1 team of 2 players

Men's beach tournament

Men's indoor tournament

Team roster

Group play

Quarter-finals

Weightlifting

Poland has qualified 6 men and 3 women.
Men

Women

Wrestling

Poland has qualified at least only four quota places in wrestling events.

Men's Greco-Roman

Women's freestyle

References

Nations at the 2012 Summer Olympics
2012
Summer Olympics